I Need Romance is a 2011 South Korean romantic comedy series starring Jo Yeo-jeong, Kim Jeong-hoon, Choi Yeo-jin, Choi Song-hyun and Choi Jin-hyuk. It aired on tvN from June 13 to August 2, 2011 on Mondays and Tuesdays at 23:00 (KST) for 16 episodes.

The cable drama revolves around three thirty-something career women and their complicated love lives. It was popular with female viewers in their 20s and 30s for depicting contemporary women in a realistic way.

Synopsis
Funny, romantic, and just a little racy, I Need Romance follows the Sex and the City-like adventures of three thirty-something best friends looking for love in modern-day Seoul.

Cast
 Cho Yeo-jeong as Sunwoo In-young 
 Kim Jeong-hoon as Kim Sung-soo 
 Choi Yeo-jin as Park Seo-yeon 
 Choi Song-hyun as Kang Hyun-joo 
 Choi Jin-hyuk as Bae Sung-hyun 
 Ha Yeon-joo as Yoon Kang-hee 
 Kim Hyung-min as Kim Deok-soo 
 Ricky Kim as Alex
 Lee Kwan-hoon as Seo Joon-yi
 Heo Tae-hee as Kim Tae-woo
 Jung Yoo-chan as Man at the airport (cameo, ep. 4)
 Lee Da-hee as Lee Min-jung (cameo, ep. 16)
 Park Woo-chun as Jung Hae-woon (cameo, ep. 16)
 Kim So-yeon  as young Sung-soo's girlfriend (cameo, ep. 16)

Spin-off
Currently, there are two spin-offs, I Need Romance 2012 (2012) and I Need Romance 3 (2014).

References

External links
  
 
 

2011 South Korean television series debuts
2011 South Korean television series endings
Korean-language television shows
TVN (South Korean TV channel) television dramas
South Korean romance television series
South Korean comedy television series
Television series by JS Pictures